Olawale Sulaiman is a Nigerian neurosurgeon and academic. He is the CEO and Chairman of RNZ Global Ltd. and co-founder and Chief Medical Officer of Hippo Technologies. He also founded RNZ Foundation to provide free neurosurgical care for Nigerian patients and training for healthcare professionals. In 2019, He was appointed as Special Adviser to the Governor of Kwara State on Health Matters.

Education 
He received a combined MD/MSc degree at Medical University, Varna, Bulgaria and a PhD in neuroscience at the University of Alberta, Edmonton, Canada. His neurosurgery training was completed at the University of Manitoba, Winnipeg, Canada. He completed post-residency fellowship training in complex nerve reconstruction at Louisiana State University and complex spine surgery at the Medical College of Wisconsin in Milwaukee, USA. He is board-certified in neurosurgery by the Royal College of Physicians and Surgeons of Canada.

Career 
He was System Chairman of Neurosurgery and Co-Medical Director at the Ochsner Neuroscience Institute until January 2019 and then serves as the Medical Director, International Medicine, African Region, Ochsner Health system. He is a Professor of neurosurgery and spinal surgery at Tulane University. He is the CEO and Chairman of RNZ Global Ltd, a healthcare development, operations and management he started in 2010. He is co-founder and Chief Medical Officer of Hippo Technologies, a virtual healthcare technology company he helped found in 2020.

Charity 
He has been involved in neurosurgery and spine surgeries in Nigeria and provides free neurosurgery services to indigent population that cannot afford complex spine surgeries. He and his wife, Patricia Sulaiman launched RNZ Foundation for their philanthropic activities in Nigeria.

Personal life 
He is married to Patricia, a nurse practitioner, and they have 3 children.

Award 
In October 2022, a Nigerian national honour of Commander of the Order of the Niger (CON) was conferred on him by President Muhammadu Buhari.

References 

Year of birth missing (living people)
Living people
Nigerian Muslims
Nigerian academics
Nigerian expatriates in the United States
Nigerian nonprofit businesspeople
Nigerian neuroscientists
Nigerian neurosurgeons
Tulane University faculty
University of Alberta alumni
University of Manitoba alumni